Montamy is a former commune in the Calvados department in the Normandy region in northwestern France. On 1 January 2016, it was merged into the new commune of Souleuvre-en-Bocage. The 18th-century French civil servant and encyclopédiste Didier-François d'Arclais de Montamy was born in Montany.

Population

See also
Communes of the Calvados department

References

Former communes of Calvados (department)
Calvados communes articles needing translation from French Wikipedia